The qualification for the 1987 European Competition for Women's Football was held between September 26, 1984 & October 12, 1986. The first-placed teams qualified.

Results

Group 1

Norway qualified for the final tournament.

Group 2

England qualified for the final tournament.

Group 3

Sweden qualified for the final tournament.

Group 4

Italy qualified for the final tournament.

References

External links
1984–87 UEFA Women's EURO at UEFA.com
Tables & results at RSSSF.com

UEFA Women's Championship qualification
UEFA
UEFA
UEFA
Qualifying